Presidential Rule of Law Initiative, or US-China Rule of Law Initiative, was a project between the United States and People's Republic of China to expand bilateral cooperation in the field of law.

In 1998, President Bill Clinton and President Jiang Zemin agreed to this program.   The special representative for the U.S. side was Paul Gewirtz.

One project of this initiative was the American Law Library program, which was to translate hundreds of books of American law into Chinese.

External links
 Paul Gewirtz, The US-China Rule of Law Initiative  (pdf file), William & Mary Bill of Rights Journal, Vol.11, pp. 603–621 (2003).
Introduction to the Presidential Rule of Law Initiative

China–United States relations
R